Sam Faulkner is a photographer and filmmaker based in London.

Life and Work
In 1994 Faulkner gained a BA Hons in Philosophy from King's College London. He lives in Islington, London.

From 2009 until 2014 Faulkner worked on a series of portraits made on the battlefield of Waterloo in Belgium.

Over the summer of 2015, the work was exhibited at Somerset House, in London to commemorate the 200 anniversary of the Battle of Waterloo.
The exhibition was designed and curated by Patrick Kinmonth.

Faulkner's book, Unseen Waterloo:The Conflict Revisited

was published to coincide with the exhibition.  Publisher: Impress; 2015.

Sam Faulkner founded Fashion Films

Awards
1995: Ian Parry Scholarship for young Photographers for his work from Afghanistan.
2001: Observer Hodge Award for his ongoing work on the war on drugs.
2005 Winston Churchill Memorial Trust Fellowship for his ongoing work on the war on drugs.
2008 BJP Project Assistance Award for on going work about the war on drugs
2010 Getty Grant For Good for work on female genital mutilation in Mali

References

External links
Official photography Website
Official film website
Unseen Waterloo website
Battle of Waterloo reenactment
Fashion Films

Alumni of King's College London
Photographers from London